There were eight special elections to the United States House of Representatives in 1953, during the 83rd United States Congress, giving Democrats two additional seats.

List of elections 

|-
| 
| Edward E. Cox
|  | Democratic
| 1924
|  | Incumbent member-elect died December 24, 1952.New member elected February 4, 1953.Democratic hold.
| nowrap | 

|-
| 
| Thomas B. Stanley
|  | Democratic
| 1946
|  | Incumbent resigned February 3, 1953, to run for Governor of Virginia.New member elected April 14, 1953.Democratic hold.
| nowrap | 

|-
| 
| Joseph R. Bryson
|  | Democratic
| 1938
|  | Incumbent died March 10, 1953.New member elected June 2, 1953.Democratic hold.
| nowrap | 

|-
| 
| Adolph J. Sabath
|  | Democratic
| 1906
|  | Incumbent member-elect died November 6, 1952.New member elected July 7, 1953.Democratic hold.
| nowrap | 

|-
| 
| Garrett Withers
|  | Democratic
| 1952
|  | Incumbent died April 30, 1953.New member elected August 1, 1953.Democratic hold.
| nowrap | 

|-
| 
| Merlin Hull
|  | Republican
| 19281930 1934
|  | Incumbent died May 17, 1953.New member elected October 13, 1953.Democratic gain.
| nowrap | 

|-
| 
| Clifford P. Case
|  | Republican
| 1944
|  | Incumbent resigned August 16, 1953 to run for Governor of New Jersey.New member elected November 3, 1953.Democratic gain.
| nowrap | 

|-
| 
| Norris Poulson
|  | Republican
| 19421944 1946
|  | Incumbent resigned June 11, 1953, after being elected Mayor of Los Angeles.New member elected November 10, 1953.Republican hold.
| nowrap | 

|}

References 

 
1953